State Route 235 (SR 235) is a  north–south state highway in the western portion of the U.S. state of Ohio.

Prior to late 1968, SR 235's northern terminus was at an intersection with State Route 4 and then State Route 69, which ran from downtown Dayton northward to State Route 65.  With the reconstruction of SR 4/SR 69 to a high speed thoroughfare from I-75 to I-70, SR 69 southwards was discontinued, and northwards from the intersection was renumbered as an almost 200 mile northern extension of SR 235. According to the Ohio Department of Transportation District 7, this renumbering occurred because the number 69 has certain sexual meanings in popular culture, and the signs kept getting stolen. The resulting denontation suggests a spur of US 35 which might also have been considered.

Route description
The portion of SR 235 within Fairborn is designated "Army Specialist Jesse Adam Snow Memorial Highway", in honor of a Fairborn High School graduate who was killed by enemy fire on November 14, 2010 in Afghanistan.

History

1926 – Original route certified; originally routed along its current alignment from Oldtown to Fairborn (which was Fairfield and Osborn in 1926).
1969 – Extended north to its current terminus along previous State Route 69.

On November 9, 2012, the Clark County-Springfield Transportation Coordinating Committee announced that a roundabout would be constructed at the intersection of SR 235 and SR 41 in Pike Township, which has been the site of numerous vehicle crashes, including five fatalities from 1992 to 2013. Construction on the $1.1 million project began in June 2014 and was completed the weekend before Monday, September 15. It is the first roundabout in Clark County and is believed to be the first in Ohio with all approaches at high speed, .

State Route 69 before 1969
1923 – Originally routed from Dayton to Forest.

Future
The Ohio Department of Transportation (ODOT) and the Clark County-Springfield Transportation Coordinating Committee have conducted a SR 235 Corridor Management Study, examining improvements to SR 235 in Bethel Township, between US 40 to the north, and the Greene County line to the south. The study primarily covered the Park Layne section of the township. The study area has had many vehicle crashes and four pedestrian fatalities between 2007 and 2010. The road has many closely spaced commercial driveways and lacks crosswalks, among other problems. Proposed changes included a raised median with breaks only at a few major cross streets, consolidated driveways limited to right-in/right-out access, and jughandles or U-turns at each end of the corridor for turnarounds. Other proposals included U-turns at the busiest cross street, Styer Drive, roundabouts at the major cross streets and "backage" roads. Public meetings related to this study were held in September 2011 and April 2012. The projected cost of the improvements ranged from $7.4 million to $12.2 million and construction was not expected to begin until 2017 to 2020. In mid-October 2012, it was decided by the Ohio Department of Transportation and Clark County officials to make about $3 million in improvements to this stretch of SR 235, including the consolidation of driveways and the construction of cul-de-sacs. Construction is expected to begin in 2015. The development of any "backage" roads will be left to future private developers.

In Xenia Township, Greene County, north of Xenia, ODOT plans to convert the intersection with US 68, SR 235's southern terminus, to a roundabout. As of summer 2020, construction is expected to begin in spring 2023 and to be completed that fall, with an estimated cost of $2 million.

Major intersections

References

235
Transportation in Hardin County, Ohio
Transportation in Montgomery County, Ohio
Transportation in Greene County, Ohio
Transportation in Clark County, Ohio
Transportation in Champaign County, Ohio
Transportation in Logan County, Ohio
Transportation in Hancock County, Ohio
Transportation in Wood County, Ohio